Eglė is a Lithuanian feminine given name. Individuals bearing the name Eglė include:
Eglė Balčiūnaitė (born 1988), Lithuanian middle distance runner
Eglė Janulevičiūtė (born 19??), Lithuanian classical pianist
Eglė Jurgaitytė (born 1998), Lithuanian pop singer
Eglė Karpavičiūtė (born 1984), Lithuanian painter
Eglė Rakauskaitė (born 1967), Lithuanian visual artist
Eglė Staišiūnaitė (born 1988), Lithuanian hurdler
Eglė Zablockytė (born 1989), Lithuanian cyclist

Mythology  
Eglė the Queen of Serpents

References 

Lithuanian feminine given names
Feminine given names